Blet may refer to:
 Blet, a commune in France
 Bletting, a process associated with the ripening of some fruits
 Stéphane Blet (1969-2022), French pianist and composer

BLET may refer to:
Brotherhood of Locomotive Engineers and Trainmen
Basic Law Enforcement Training